Weinmannia sylvicola, known as tōwai or tawhero, is a medium-sized evergreen tree of the family Cunoniaceae native to northern New Zealand. It grows to 15 m or more, with a trunk up to 1 m in diameter. Adult leaves are toothed and leathery, with up to five pairs of leaflets. Juvenile leaves are thinner and have up to ten pairs of leaflets. Flowers are small and pink or white, occurring in 8–12 cm racemes. Fruits are 4–5 cm capsules, which release many tiny seeds that are dispersed by wind.
Tōwai occurs in forest and forest margins from North Cape south to the Waitākere Ranges west of Auckland. A closely related tree, kāmahi (W. racemosa), replaces tōwai south of latitude 37°S.

References

Trees of New Zealand
sylvicola
Flora of the North Island